Paul Pömpner (28 December 1892 – 17 May 1934) was a German international footballer who played for Wacker Halle and VfB Leipzig. He also played for the German national team on six occasions.

References

External links
 

1892 births
1934 deaths
Association football forwards
German footballers
Germany international footballers
1. FC Lokomotive Leipzig players
People from Weißenfels
Footballers from Saxony-Anhalt